Andre Agassi was the defending champion but lost in the semifinals to Ivan Lendl.

Lendl won in the final 6–2, 6–1 against Jaime Yzaga.

Seeds
A champion seed is indicated in bold text while text in italics indicates the round in which that seed was eliminated. The top eight seeds received a bye to the second round.

  Ivan Lendl (champion)
  Mats Wilander (second round)
  Andre Agassi (semifinals)
  Tim Mayotte (third round)
  Yannick Noah (second round)
  Aaron Krickstein (quarterfinals)
  Brad Gilbert (quarterfinals)
  Michael Chang (semifinals)
  Andrés Gómez (third round)
  Slobodan Živojinović (third round)
  Luiz Mattar (third round)
  Dan Goldie (first round)
  Jay Berger (first round)
  Jim Courier (third round)
  Marcelo Filippini (quarterfinals)
  Jordi Arrese (third round)

Draw

Finals

Top half

Section 1

Section 2

Bottom half

Section 3

Section 4

References
 1989 Eagle Tournament of Champions Draw

1989 Singles
1989 Grand Prix (tennis)